Table for One is the debut solo album by British singer-songwriter Darren Hayman.  It was released by The Track & Field Organisation in 2006. The cover art and the title track are inspired by Cafe Rodi, in Blackhorse Lane, Walthamstow, London.

Track listing
 "Caravan Song" – 3:11
 "The English Head" – 4:42
 "Perfect Homes" – 3:33
 "That's Not What She's Like" – 3:43
 "Grey Hairs" – 3:44
 "You Chose Me" – 4:11
 "The National Canine Defence League" – 4:44
 "The Protons and the Neutrons" – 3:52
 "Doug Yule's Velvet Underground" – 5:40
 "Everything's Wrong All the Time" – 3:59
 "A Wasted Year" – 4:53
 "Table for One" – 4:22

References

2006 debut albums
Darren Hayman albums